Tekmessa (minor planet designation: 604 Tekmessa) is a minor planet orbiting the Sun that was discovered by American astronomer Joel Hastings Metcalf on February 16, 1906.
The name may have been inspired by the asteroid's provisional designation 1906 TK.

References

External links
 
 

Background asteroids
Tekmessa
Tekmessa
Xc-type asteroids (SMASS)
19060216